The Immaculate Conception Catholic Church and Rectory in St. Helena, Nebraska was listed on the National Register of Historic Places in 2001.

The Gothic Revival church was built during 1896–1897. It was designed by architect Josef Schwartz, who also designed the similar-looking Ss.

The rectory was built in 1919 and is a two-and-a-half-story Four Square house.

The town of St. Helena had population of 87 in the 1990 census.

References

External links

Churches on the National Register of Historic Places in Nebraska
Gothic Revival architecture in Nebraska
Churches completed in 1897
Buildings and structures in Cedar County, Nebraska